Filter feeders are a sub-group of suspension feeding animals that feed by straining suspended matter and food particles from water, typically by passing the water over a specialized filtering structure. Some animals that use this method of feeding are clams, krill, sponges, baleen whales, and many fish (including some sharks). Some birds, such as flamingos and certain species of duck, are also filter feeders. Filter feeders can play an important role in clarifying water, and are therefore considered ecosystem engineers. They are also important in bioaccumulation and, as a result, as indicator organisms.

Fish

Most forage fish are filter feeders. For example, the Atlantic menhaden, a type of herring, lives on plankton caught in midwater. Adult menhaden can filter up to four gallons of water a minute and play an important role in clarifying ocean water. They are also a natural check to the deadly red tide.

In addition to these bony fish, four types of cartilaginous fishes are also filter feeders. The whale shark sucks in a mouthful of water, closes its mouth and expels the water through its gills. During the slight delay between closing the mouth and opening the gill flaps, plankton is trapped against the dermal denticles which line its gill plates and pharynx. This fine sieve-like apparatus, which is a unique modification of the gill rakers, prevents the passage of anything but fluid out through the gills (anything above 2 to 3 mm in diameter is trapped). Any material caught in the filter between the gill bars is swallowed. Whale sharks have been observed "coughing" and it is presumed that this is a method of clearing a build up of food particles in the gill rakers. The megamouth shark has luminous organs called photophores around its mouth. It is believed they may exist to lure plankton or small fish into its mouth. The basking shark is a passive filter feeder, filtering zooplankton, small fish, and invertebrates from up to 2,000 tons of water per hour. Unlike the megamouth and whale sharks, the basking shark does not appear to actively seek its quarry; but it does possess large olfactory bulbs that may guide it in the right direction. Unlike the other large filter feeders, it relies only on the water that is pushed through the gills by swimming; the megamouth shark and whale shark can suck or pump water through their gills. Manta rays can time their arrival at the spawning of large shoals of fish and feed on the free-floating eggs and sperm. This stratagem is also employed by whale sharks.

Crustaceans

Mysidacea are small crustaceans that live close to shore and hover above the sea floor, constantly collecting particles with their filter basket. They are an important food source for herring, cod, flounder, and striped bass. Mysids have a high resistance to toxins in polluted areas, and may contribute to high toxin levels in their predators.
Antarctic krill manages to directly utilize the minute phytoplankton cells, which no other higher animal of krill size can do. This is accomplished through filter feeding, using the krill's developed front legs, providing for a very efficient filtering apparatus: the six thoracopods form a very effective "feeding basket" used to collect phytoplankton from the open water. In the animation at the top of this page, the krill is hovering at a 55° angle on the spot. In lower food concentrations, the feeding basket is pushed through the water for over half a meter in an opened position, and then the algae are combed to the mouth opening with special setae on the inner side of the thoracopods.
Porcelain crabs have feeding appendages covered with setae to filter food particles from the flowing water.
Most species of barnacles are filter feeders, using their highly modified legs to sift plankton from the water.

Baleen whales

The baleen whales (Mysticeti), one of two suborders of the Cetacea (whales, dolphins, and porpoises), are characterized by having baleen plates for filtering food from water, rather than teeth. This distinguishes them from the other suborder of cetaceans, the toothed whales (Odontoceti). The suborder contains four families and fourteen species. Baleen whales typically seek out a concentration of zooplankton, swim through it, either open-mouthed or gulping, and filter the prey from the water using their baleens. A baleen is a row of a large number of keratin plates attached to the upper jaw with a composition similar to those in human hair or fingernails. These plates are triangular in section with the largest, inward-facing side bearing fine hairs forming a filtering mat. Right whales are slow swimmers with large heads and mouths. As the right whale swims, a front gap between the two rows of baleen plates lets the water in together with the prey, while the baleens filter out the water. Rorquals such as the blue whale, in contrast, have smaller heads, are fast swimmers with short and broad baleen plates. To catch prey, they widely open their lower jaw — almost 90° — swim through a swarm gulping, while lowering their tongue so that the head's ventral grooves expand and vastly increase the amount of water taken in. Baleen whales typically eat krill in polar or subpolar waters during summers, but can also take schooling fish, especially in the Northern Hemisphere. Gray whales live in shallow waters feeding primarily on bottom-living organisms such as amphipods.

Bivalves

Bivalves are aquatic molluscs which have two-part shells. Typically both shells (or valves) are symmetrical along the hinge line. The class has 30,000 species, including scallops, clams, oysters and mussels. Most bivalves are filter feeders (although some have taken up scavenging and predation), extracting organic matter from the sea in which they live. Nephridia, the shellfish version of kidneys, remove the waste material. Buried bivalves feed by extending a siphon to the surface. For example, oysters draw water in over their gills through the beating of cilia. Suspended food (phytoplankton, zooplankton, algae and other water-borne nutrients and particles) are trapped in the mucus of a gill, and from there are transported to the mouth, where they are eaten, digested and expelled as feces or pseudofeces. Each oyster filters up to five litres of water per hour. Scientists believe that the Chesapeake Bay's once-flourishing oyster population historically filtered the estuary's entire water volume of excess nutrients every three or four days. Today that process would take almost a year, and sediment, nutrients, and algae can cause problems in local waters. Oysters filter these pollutants, and either eat them or shape them into small packets that are deposited on the bottom where they are harmless.

Bivalve shellfish recycle nutrients that enter waterways from human and agricultural sources. Nutrient bioextraction is "an environmental management strategy by which nutrients are removed from an aquatic ecosystem through the harvest of enhanced biological production, including the aquaculture of suspension-feeding shellfish or algae". Nutrient removal by shellfish, which are then harvested from the system, has the potential to help address environmental issues including excess inputs of nutrients (eutrophication), low dissolved oxygen, reduced light availability and impacts on eelgrass, harmful algal blooms, and increases in incidence of paralytic shellfish poisoning (PSP). For example, the average harvested mussel contains: 0.8–1.2% nitrogen and 0.06–0.08% phosphorus Removal of enhanced biomass can not only combat eutrophication and also support the local economy by providing product for animal feed or compost. In Sweden, environmental agencies utilize mussel farming as a management tool in improving water quality conditions, where mussel bioextraction efforts have been evaluated and shown to be a highly effective source of fertilizer and animal feed In the U.S., researchers are investigating potential to model the use of shellfish and seaweed for nutrient mitigation in certain areas of Long Island Sound.

Bivalves are also largely used as bioindicators to monitor the health of an aquatic environment, either fresh- or seawater. Their population status or structure, physiology, behaviour, or their content of certain elements or compounds can reveal the contamination status of any aquatic ecosystem. They are useful as they are sessile, which means they are closely representative of the environment where they are sampled or placed (caging), and they breathe water all the time, exposing their gills and internal tissues: bioaccumulation. One of the most famous projects in that field is the Mussel Watch Programme in America.

Sponges

Sponges have no true circulatory system; instead, they create a water current which is used for circulation. Dissolved gases are brought to cells and enter the cells via simple diffusion. Metabolic wastes are also transferred to the water through diffusion. Sponges pump remarkable amounts of water. Leuconia, for example, is a small leuconoid sponge about 10 cm tall and 1 cm in diameter. It is estimated that water enters through more than 80,000 incurrent canals at a speed of 6 cm per minute. However, because Leuconia has more than 2 million flagellated chambers whose combined diameter is much greater than that of the canals, water flow through chambers slows to 3.6 cm per hour. Such a flow rate allows easy food capture by the collar cells. Water is expelled through a single osculum at a velocity of about 8.5 cm/second: a jet force capable of carrying waste products some distance away from the sponge.

Cnidarians
The moon jellyfish has a grid of fibres which are slowly pulled through the water. The motion is so slow that copepods cannot sense it and do not react with an escape response.

Other filter-feeding cnidarians include sea pens, sea fans, plumose anemones, and Xenia.

Tunicates

Tunicates, such as ascidians, salps and sea squirts, are chordates which form a sister group to the vertebrates. Nearly all tunicates are suspension feeders, capturing planktonic particles by filtering sea water through their bodies. Water is drawn into the body through the inhalant buccal siphon by the action of cilia lining the gill slits. The filtered water is then expelled through a separate exhalant siphon. To obtain enough food, a typical tunicate needs to process about one body-volume of water per second.

Birds

Flamingos filter-feed on brine shrimp. Their oddly shaped beaks are specially adapted to separate mud and silt from the food they eat, and are uniquely used upside-down. The filtering of food items is assisted by hairy structures called lamellae which line the mandibles, and the large rough-surfaced tongue.

Prions are specialised petrels with filter-feeding habits. Their name comes from their saw-like jaw edges, used to scope out small planktionic animals.

The extinct swan Annakacygna is speculated to be a filter-feeder due to its bill proportions being similar to those of shoveler ducks. It is unique in being a large, flightless marine animal, unlike the smaller still volant flamingos and prions.

Pterosaurs
Traditionally, Ctenochasmatoidea as a group has been listed as filter-feeders, due to their long, multiple slender teeth, clearly well adapted to trap prey. However, only Pterodaustro showcases a proper pumping mechanism, having up-turned jaws and powerful jaw and tongue musculature. Other ctenochasmatoids lack these, and are now instead thought to have been spoonbill-like catchers, using their specialised teeth simply to offer a larger surface area. Tellingly, these teeth, while small and numerous, are comparatively unspecialised to the baleen-like teeth of Pterodaustro.

Boreopterids are thought to have relied on a kind of rudimentary filter feeding, using their long, slender teeth to trap small fish, though probably lacking the pumping mechanism of Pterodaustro. In essence, their foraging mechanism was similar to that of modern young Platanista "dolphins".

Marine reptiles
Filter feeding habits are conspicuously rare among Mesozoic marine reptiles, the main filter feeding niche being seemingly instead occupied by pachycormid fish. However, some sauropsids have been suggested to have engaged in filter feeding. Henodus was a placodont with unique baleen-like denticles and features of the hyoid and jaw musculature comparable to those of flamingos. Combined with its lacustrine environment, it might have occupied a similar ecological niche. In particular, it was probably a herbivore, filtering out algae and other small-sized flora from the substrates.
Stomatosuchidae is a family of freshwater crocodylomorphs with rorqual-like jaws and minuscule teeth, and the unrelated Cenozoic Mourasuchus shares similar adaptations.
Hupehsuchia is a lineage of bizarre Triassic reptiles adapted for suspension feeding.
Some plesiosaurs might have had filter-feeding habits.

See also
 Particle (ecology)
 Planktivore
 Predation
 Spider webs – aerial biofilters, with analogies to aquatic filter feeding

Notes

References

Some aspects of water filtering activity of filter-feeders // Hydrobiologia. 2005. Vol. 542, No. 1. pp. 275–286

External links
Filter feeder of krill 
Mussel Watch Programme

Aquatic ecology